Sendy Santamaria is an illustrator, artist and visual designer from San Diego, CA based in the San Francisco Bay Area.

Biography 
Sendy Santamaria was born on September 25, 1996, in San Diego, California. Santamaria received a Bachelor of Fine Arts degree from the California College of the Arts in the Bay Area in 2018.

Art 
Santamaria's art features themes such as Xicanx culture, Mexican migration, and the narratives of working class communities. Her work consists of illustrations, public murals, commissioned murals, acrylic paintings, graphic arts and design, embroidery, hand lettering, and printmaking. In 2021, her art work was featured in a New York Times article.

 2015 Maldita Rutina, acrylic painted on electrical box, collaboration with VISUAL public art project.
2018 Ramon Ayala album cover, acrylic,12x12.
2018 Don Zonkey, acrylic, 11x14.
2019 Bacon News, digital illustration, 5x5, 826 Valencia publication (The Bridge Built Out Of Stars) Art direction by Megan Ryan.
2019 Tijuana Zine Fest, digital design, 11x17, poster design for Tijuana Zine Fest 2019.
2019 Perdono pero nunca olvido, acrylic, 8.5x11.
2021 Trabajo Digno, acrylic and colored pencil, 8x5.

Featured work 
In 2012, as a high school student attending High Tech High Media Arts, Santamaria was an Assistant Illustrator for the “44th and Landis” exhibition at the Museum of Contemporary Art San Diego. Santamaria's work was part of the Activate the Archive: CAPP Street Project Exhibition sponsored by California College of the Arts Libraries Exhibition Program in 2018. Santamaria was highlighted as a featured artist in the Gay Area: Bay Area Queer Artist Showcase in 2019. Santamaria was also a featured artist and part of the Galeria de la Raza’s 2019 Holiday Mercado. Her work was also displayed at the Faultline Art Space, a gallery in East Oakland, for the Remastered Album Art Tribute, in 2018, and the 10XTen Womxn Art Show in 2021. Santamaria created the poster design for the 2019 Tijuana Zine Fest held in Tijuana, Mexico.

In 2020, in collaboration with Alameda County Health Care Services Agency, Santamaria created illustrations for the Alameda County Health Care Services Agency Center for Healthy Schools and Communities Guide and for the Fight COVID-19 Our Lives Are Precious Commercial in Spanish. Moreover, Sendy worked as a Design Associate at the educational non-profit organization 826 Valencia in San Francisco, CA where she designed the book cover for “The Bridge Built Out of Stars” that features the writing of students; during her time at 826 Valencia she works on multiple illustration projects and created their annual report. Santamaria is a Visual Designer and Graphic Arts Mentor at the Bay Area nonprofit BAYCAT Bayview-Hunters Point Center for Arts and Technology dedicated to working with youth of color to become future diverse storytellers in the media and creative industries.

References

External links 
 https://www.sendysantamaria.com/

1996 births
Living people
21st-century American women artists
American muralists
American women illustrators
Artists from San Diego
California College of the Arts alumni
Chicana feminism
American embroiderers